Khalid Al-Shaybani is an Egyptian poet, novelist, and screenwriter born in December 1979. He studied media at the Faculty of Arts and specialized in journalism and worked in many Egyptian and Arabic newspapers and magazines, and later on he devoted himself to literary and artistic writings.

 Member of the Egyptian Writers Union, member of the International Association of Authors, Composers and Publishers in France, and a member of the Egyptian Authors Association.
 One of his most famous poems is "The Spokesman for Love", which achieved an awakening in classical poetry and brought back followers from all over the Arab world after a long period of hiatus.
 He has received many local and international awards, mentioned in detail in the Awards and Honors section.
 He has written many popular commercials and recently directed one of the ads he had written.
 He wrote the poem "Anwar al-Burdah" in praise and love of Mohammad, following the footsteps of the poem Al-Burdah by Imam Al-Busiri, in which the number of verses in ‘Anwar al-Burdah’ exceeded those of Al-Burdah and Nahj Al-Burda by the prince of poets Ahmed Shawqi. Al-Shaybani committed to the fact that the verses rhymed without repeating a word from the beginning till the end of his poem, which is something that "Shawqi" or "Al-Busiri" did not adhere to in their poems, making his poem the longest and most unique poem in loving Mohammad.

Life 
Khalid Al-Shaybani was born on the 10th  of December 1979 in the Kingdom of Saudi Arabia to Egyptian parents who work there, but they soon returned to Cairo and settled in the Egyptian capital where al-Shaybani grew up. His parents ’origins gave him multiple points of view for the Egyptian society. His father is from Upper Egypt from the "Al- Shaybani" family in Sohag, and his mother is from Lower Egypt from the "Munis" family in Mansoura. Khalid lives in the Maadi neighborhood in Cairo, so he developed an image with many dimensions of the Egyptian society in its various directions, and this was driven by his work in journalism and his study of it at an early age. But soon he devoted himself to literary and artistic writings, to show his creativity in poetry, novel, song writing and script. Al-Shaybani is considered the first to combine these four arts of creative writing. Today, He is one of the few who write classic Arabic poetry.

Awards and honors 

 Honoring from Ain Shams University for all his artistic and literary works.
 His short film "Chess Turn دور شطرنج " won the Cairo World Cup Shield Award for Artistic Works, the Best Film Award from the Media Science Festival (Bronze), and the Audience Award at the Youssef Chahine Festival 2017.
 He won the Excellence in Poetry Award for the poetry of Snow White from the National Theater Festival in 2018 and he is the first poet to receive an award in poetry from the festival despite reaching its eleventh session.
 He won the Best Story, Screenplay and Dialogue Award from the Sakia Festival for Short Films for his short film ''Chess Turn'' 2019.
 His short film "Chess Turn" won the Best Film Award at the Jerash International Film Festival in Jordan (Bronze).

Personal life 
Al-Shaybani is married and has a son, Yassin, and 3 daughters, Fatima, Rodina, and Sajda.

Poetic Works

Fictional Works

Dramatic works written by him (story, screenplay and dialogue)

Lyrics for Dramatic Works

Song Lyrics

References 

Egyptian poets
Egyptian novelists
Egyptian male poets
1979 births
Living people